Shambhu Shikhar is an Indian Comedian, Poet, and writer from Madhubani, Bihar, India. He was the semi-finalist of the Great Indian Laughter Challenge -III aired on StarPlus in 2007. He was awarded with Bharatendyu Harishchand Puraskar by the Hindi Academy, Government of Delhi in 2010.

He has been appeared in various television shows like Wah! Wah! Kya Baat Hai! on SAB TV, News18 India's Netaji Lapete Mein, and Idhar Udhar and Shikhar on 94.3 MY FM.

Life and career 
He was born on 10 January 1984, in Madhubani, Bihar, India. He had started his career as standup comedian from Wah! Wah! Kya Baat Hai! on SAB TV hosted by Shailesh Lodha and Neha Mehta. Then he appeared in StarPlus's comedy show The Great Indian Laughter Challenge in 2007, where he was a semi-finalist.

Shikhar has completed his master's degree in political science from Motilal Nehru College, Delhi University

Shambhu Shikhar has done Kavi Sammelan on Red Fort and various other cities in India and Dubai.

Shambhu has published various novels and collections of his poems. He has recently released his novel called Organic Love II with "Harf Publication", He has already published "Silwaton Ki Mehak" (2014) and "Sanyasi Yoddhay" (2017). He is currently working on his upcoming book "Chini Ko Jama Karke Fir Se Ganna Bana Du" 

He had become an internet sensation from his song "Hum Dharti Putra Bihari". He has done Kavi sammelan in various cities and states of India. He is well known as a political satirist.

In the year 2022, Shambhu Shikhar participated in India’s Laughter Champion judged by (Shekhar Suman and Archana Puran Singh) as a contestant  with Abhay Sharma, Nitesh Shetty, Mujawar Malegaowi, Vighnesh Pande, Hemant Pandey and many more.

Bibliography 
 "Organic Love II", 2022 
 "Silwaton Ki Mehak"

Television

References

External links  

 Biography

1984 births
Living people
Hindi-language writers
Hindi-language poets
People from New Delhi
Indian humorists
21st-century Indian poets
Indian male poets
21st-century Indian male writers